Dumbarton Harp Football Club was a football club based in the town of Dumbarton in the west of Scotland. They were formed in 1894 by Irish Catholic immigrants to the area in a similar way to the formation of Celtic in Glasgow and Hibernian in Edinburgh.

There was also a junior club at the same time as Dumbarton Harp, formed in 1906. Their first game was against "Corinthians" (probably the local "Dumbarton Corinthians" that were around at this time) on 22 August 1906, losing 2–1.

History
Dumbarton Harp played the majority of their existence in local football leagues, such as the Glasgow and District Junior League, which they joined in their inaugural season, or the Inter County Football League in season 1916–17. In 1910 they were champions of the Scottish Football Union which they left in 1912 to participate in the Scottish Reserve Football League. They did play for a short spell in the Scottish Football League when it expanded to a three division set up in the 1920s. They finished tenth (out of 16 clubs) in the inaugural Division Three in the 1923–24 season, but withdrew midway through the 1924–25 season when it became clear they could not meet their financial commitments, and were disbanded.

Ground
Dumbarton Harp played at Meadow Park in the centre of the town, close to Dumbarton Central railway station. The site of Meadow Park is now occupied by industrial buildings.

Colours
1894?–1909? – Green shirts, white shorts, green socks
1909?–1910? – Green and white hooped shirts, white shorts, green socks
1910?–1925 – Green shirts, white shorts, green socks

Legacy
The name Dumbarton Harp lives on as a Celtic Supporters Club, and also as a local amateur football club of the same name.

Honours 

 Scottish Union:
 Champions: 1909–10

 Inter County League: 
 Champions: 1916–17

 Dumbartonshire Cup: 
 Winners: 1909–10, 1911–12, 1912–13

 Dumbartonshire Charity Cup: 
 Winners: 1918–19

References

 
Association football clubs established in 1894
Association football clubs disestablished in 1925
Football clubs in Scotland
Defunct football clubs in Scotland
Football in West Dunbartonshire
Scottish Football League teams
1894 establishments in Scotland
1936 disestablishments in Scotland
Dumbarton
Scottish Junior Football Association clubs
Irish diaspora sports clubs in Scotland